B. Radhakrishnan is a Carrom player from India. At the third SAARC Carrom Championship (1999) at Malé, Maldives, he won fourth place in the singles event and won the team event as part of the Indian team.

External links
 B. Radhakrishnan - Carrom champion

Tamil sportspeople
Indian carrom players
Living people
Year of birth missing (living people)
Place of birth missing (living people)